A single-edged sword may be any single-edged bladed weapon with a hilt which is shorter than a polearm.
Backsword
Cutlass
Dao (sword)
Dha (sword)
Falcata
Falchion
Falx
Katana
Khopesh
Khyber sword
Kopis
Messer
Sabre
Scimitar
Scythe sword

See also
Blade
Knife
Sword